Arpi is a village in the Areni Municipality of the Vayots Dzor Province in Armenia.

Etymology 
The village is also known as Arpa.

Gallery

References

External links 

Populated places in Vayots Dzor Province
Erivan Governorate